Raquel Zimmermann (born May 6, 1983) is a Brazilian model.
Raquel was announced as a Revlon ambassador in January 2018.

Biography
Zimmermann was born in Bom Retiro do Sul, Rio Grande do Sul.  

Raquel reports that she practices the Transcendental Meditation technique.

Discovery and modeling career
Zimmermann was discovered by a scouting agency in Porto Alegre, Brazil at the age of 14 and made her way to Japan and on to Paris. Shortly thereafter, Steven Meisel booked her for the cover of Vogue Italia, September 2000, and her modelling career began in earnest.

Zimmermann has done campaigns for brands such as: Alexander McQueen, Balenciaga, Bloomingdales, Bottega Veneta, Cavalli jeans, Cerruti, Chanel eyewear, Chloé, Christian Dior, CK by Calvin Klein, Clairol, Dolce & Gabbana, DSquared², Emanuel Ungaro, Escada, Fendi, GAP, Gucci, Giorgio Armani, H&M, Hermès, Hugo Boss, Isabel Marant, Jean Paul Gaultier, Jimmy Choo, Louis Vuitton, Lanvin, Loewe, MAC Cosmetics, Marc Jacobs, Max Mara, Moschino, Neiman Marcus, Nina Ricci, Prada, Roberto Cavalli, Shiatzy Chen, Salvatore Ferragamo, Valentino, Viktor & Rolf, Versace, Yves Saint Laurent, and Zara.

She has regularly appeared in American Vogue, French Vogue, Italian Vogue, W, Harper's Bazaar, Visionaire, POP and Self Service. Zimmermann has appeared on many magazine covers, such as: Vogue (Brazil, USA, Italy, France, Japan, China, Greece, Germany, Russia), Harper's Bazaar, Elle, Numéro, L'Officiel, Marie Claire, i-D, V and French.

In the May 2007 issue of American Vogue she was featured on the cover with fellow models Doutzen Kroes, Caroline Trentini,  Hilary Rhoda, Sasha Pivovarova, Agyness Deyn, Coco Rocha, Jessica Stam, Chanel Iman, and Lily Donaldson as one of the "World's Next Top Models." In 2008 casting agent James Scully, who is responsible for picking which model is to score a spot on top runways, said in regard to Zimmermann:The energizer model! I think she's the only model of the last ten years who never goes out of fashion. It's as though she never ages yet gets better-looking each season. Probably the most versatile model of all, she truly could be in any show. Her professionalism rivals any model and her timeliness is equal to Cindy Crawford's, whose punctuality was legendary.

In 2007 Zimmermann appeared on the cover of V and in the first ever television commercial by Gucci for its new fragrance, Gucci by Gucci, directed by David Lynch.

Zimmermann was ranked number one on international model ranking website models.com from December 2007 until February 2010.  she was, because of her long run on the Top 100, ranked 14 on the Top Model Icons of All Time list.

The May 2009 issue of American Vogue featured her as one of the faces of the season, alongside Liya Kebede, Lara Stone, Natasha Poly, Caroline Trentini, Jourdan Dunn, Natalia Vodianova, Anna Jagodzinska, and Isabeli Fontana.

Vogue Paris declared her one of the top 30 models of the 2000s.

She also appeared in the 2002, 2005 and 2006 Victoria's Secret fashion shows.

She starred in the Lady Gaga music video for "Born This Way", where she was featured wearing designer clothing and helped give birth to a non-prejudiced race from the "Mother Monster".

Zimmerman was announced as a Revlon ambassador in January 2018.

References

External links

Raquel Zimmermann's personal website

Raquel Zimmermann's Model Diary on style.com
Raquel Zimmermann Number 1 on models.com

1983 births
Living people
People from Rio Grande do Sul
Brazilian people of German descent
Brazilian models of German descent
Brazilian female models
Naturalized citizens of the United States